Mesaka, or Ugarə, is a Tivoid language spoken in Cameroon.

Batomo may be a separate language, or it may be the same as Motomo (Oliti, Matchi), a dialect of Iceve-Maci (Ethnologue, 22nd edition).

Phonology

Vowels
Vowel length is often contrastive in sequences of two similar vowels. Sequences of dissimilar vowels are not observed unless there's a consonant in-between. 
 

Mesaka is also a tonal language with two tones: high and low.

References

Languages of Cameroon
Tivoid languages